Yanggak Bridge (양각교) is the second (west–east) of the six major bridges on the Taedong River in Pyongyang. The middle of the bridge has an off-ramp to Yanggak Island.

References

Bridges in North Korea
Buildings and structures in Pyongyang